Akhtar Hussain Khan (1900 – 12 June, 1974) was a classical vocalist and musician belonging to one of the major vocal gharanas (musical traditions) of Hindustani classical music – the Patiala Gharana. He was the only son as well as a student of one of the founders of the Patiala Gharana, Ali Baksh Jarnail (1850-1920). Besides his father, Khan also studied music with Mian Qadir Bakhsh II of Sialkot.

He was the father and teacher of Ustad Fateh Ali Khan and Ustad Amanat Ali Khan, the renowned classical music duo from Pakistan. Other notable students include Ghulam Hussain Khan, Ghulam Rasool, Ustad Talib Hussain, Qazi Habib Ullah, and Tahira Syed. 

In addition to being a classical vocalist, Khan also served as a supervisor at Radio Pakistan, Lahore. 

Khan died on 12 June, 1974 in Lahore, Pakistan, a few months prior to the death of his eldest son, Ustad Amanat Ali Khan (1922 – 18 September 1974).

References

Indian male classical musicians
Indian Muslims
Patiala gharana
Classical music in Pakistan
Vocal gharanas
Indian classical musicians